William Arthur Stewart Buxton (born March 10, 1949) is a Canadian computer scientist and designer. He is a partner researcher at Microsoft Research. He is known for being one of the pioneers in the human–computer interaction field.

Background and contributions
Buxton received his bachelor's degree in music from Queen's University in 1973 and his master's degree in computer science from the University of Toronto in 1978.

Buxton's scientific contributions include applying Fitts' law to human-computer interaction and the invention and analysis of the marking menu (together with Gordon Kurtenbach). He pioneered multi-touch interfaces and music composition tools in the late 1970s, while working in the Dynamic Graphics Project at the University of Toronto. In 2007, he published Sketching User Experiences: Getting the Design Right and the Right Design.

Buxton is a regular columnist at BusinessWeek. Before joining Microsoft Research he was chief scientist at Alias Wavefront and SGI from 1994 to 2002. In 2004, he was a visiting professor at the University of Toronto.

Buxton received the SIGCHI Lifetime Achievement Award in 2008 for his many fundamental contributions to the human–computer interaction field. As of 2010, the Bill Buxton Award is handed out annually for the best doctoral dissertation in the field of HCI, completed at a Canadian university. In 2016, he was recognized for his lifelong work in human computer interaction design and received the Digifest Digital Pioneer Award.

Honours and awards
 Recipient of the Canadian Human-Computer Communications Society (1995)
 New Media Visionary of the Year Award (2000) 
 SIGCHI Lasting Impact Award (2005) 
 Fellow of the Association for Computing Machinery (2008) 
 SIGCHI Lifetime Achievement Award (2008) 
 Doctor of Design Honoris Causa from the Ontario College of Art and Design, Toronto, Ontario (June, 2007) 
 Doctor of Laws Honoris Causa from Queen's University, Kingston, Ontario (June, 2009) 
 Doctor of Industrial Design Honoris Causa from the Technical University of Eindhoven, The Netherlands (April, 2010) 
 Doctor of Science Honoris Causa from the University of Toronto, Toronto, Ontario (June, 2013)

References

External links
Official website
Fireside chat with Bill Buxton
The Buxton Collection on Microsoft.com

Human–computer interaction researchers
Living people
Queen's University at Kingston alumni
Fellows of the Association for Computing Machinery
1949 births
Microsoft employees
Microsoft Research people
Scientists at PARC (company)
Scientists from Edmonton
Canadian computer scientists
20th-century Canadian scientists
21st-century Canadian scientists
Utrecht University alumni
University of Toronto alumni
Academic staff of Utrecht University
Academic staff of the University of Toronto